Sherrill's Inn is a historic home located near Fairview, Buncombe County, North Carolina. It is a four bay by two bay, log house of the saddle-bag variety which has been raised to two stories and weatherboarded.  Attached to it is an originally separate two-story, log building, two bays wide and two bays deep.  Also on the property are a contributing stone spring house and log meathouse.  The building was built about 1845, and used as an inn throughout much of the 19th century.

It was listed on the National Register of Historic Places in 1975.

References

External links

Log houses in the United States
Historic American Buildings Survey in North Carolina
Houses on the National Register of Historic Places in North Carolina
Houses completed in 1845
Houses in Buncombe County, North Carolina
National Register of Historic Places in Buncombe County, North Carolina
Log buildings and structures on the National Register of Historic Places in North Carolina